The AARP Movies for Grownups Award for Best Comedy was one of the AARP Movies for Grownups Awards presented annually by the AARP. The award honored the best comedy in a given year made by or featuring artists over the age of 50. The first award for Best Comedy was given to The Producers at AARP's first in-person awards ceremony in 2006.

In 2017, the AARP changed the category name to Best Comedy/Musical for just one year, discontinuing the award before the next year's ceremony.

Winners and Nominees

2000s

2010s

References

Comedy